Exceed may refer to:

 Exceed, enterprise software produced by Hummingbird Ltd.
 eXceed, a video game series by Nyu Media